"I Remember Clifford" is an instrumental jazz threnody written by jazz tenor saxophonist Benny Golson in memory of Clifford Brown, the influential and highly regarded jazz trumpeter who died in an auto accident at the age of 25. Brown and Golson had done a stint in Lionel Hampton's band together. The original recording was by Donald Byrd in January 1957.

Notable recordings 
 Bob Acri - Bob Acri (Blujazz, 2004)
 Art Blakey and The Jazz Messengers – 1958 – Paris Olympia (Fontana, 1958)
 Donald Byrd - Jazz Lab (Columbia, 1957)
 George Cables – Circle (Contemporary, 1979)
 Ray Charles – My Kind of Jazz (1970)
 Kenny Dorham – This Is the Moment! (Riverside, 1958)
 Don Ellis – Shock Treatment (2002)
 Stan Getz and Kenny Barron – People Time: The Complete Recordings (1991)
 Dizzy Gillespie – Dizzy Gillespie at Newport (Verve, 1957)
 Benny Golson – Stockholm Sojourn (Prestige, 1964)
 Roy Hargrove – The Tokyo Sessions (1991)
 Woody Herman – Woody Live East and West (CBS, 1965)
 Milt Jackson – Bags' Opus (United Artists, 1958)
 The Jazztet – Meet the Jazztet (Argo, 1960)
 Quincy Jones – The Birth of a Band (1959)
 The Manhattan Transfer – Vocalese (1985)
 Hugh Masekela – Almost Like Being in Jazz (Chissa, 2005)
 Carmen McRae –  Carmen for Cool Ones (1958)
 Helen Merrill – Brownie: Homage to Clifford Brown (1995)
 Modern Jazz Quartet – European Concert (Atlantic, 1960)
 Modern Jazz Quartet – Dedicated to Connie (Atlantic, recorded May 1960, released 1995)
 James Moody – Moody with Strings (Argo, 1960)
 Lee Morgan – Lee Morgan Vol. 3 (Blue Note, 1957)
 Oscar Peterson – Something Warm (Verve, 1962)
 Bud Powell  with Don Byas – A Tribute to Cannonball (Columbia, 1961 [1979])
 Buddy Rich – Blues Caravan (Verve, 1961)
 Sonny Rollins with Thad Jones – Now's the Time (RCA Victor, 1964)
 Masayoshi Takanaka " Brasilian Skies" (Kitty Records, 1978)
 Arturo Sandoval - I Remember Clifford (GRP, 1992)

References

External links
 Brownie Quotes – Benny Golson Golson's description of hearing of Brown's death
 Article at jazzstandards.com

1950s jazz standards
Hard bop jazz standards
Benny Golson songs
Songs with lyrics by Jon Hendricks
Songs with music by Benny Golson
1957 songs
Jazz compositions in E-flat major
Songs about jazz
Songs about musicians
Cultural depictions of jazz musicians